FC Shoro Bishkek is a Kyrgyzstani football club based in Bishkek, Kyrgyzstan that played in the top division in Kyrgyzstan, the Kyrgyzstan League.

History 
2003: Founded as FC Shoro Bishkek.
2004: Dissolved after 18 round (Club merged to SKA-Shoro Bishkek in summer 2004).

Achievements 
Kyrgyzstan League: 3
4th place: 2003

Kyrgyzstan Cup:

Current squad

External links 
Career stats by KLISF

Football clubs in Kyrgyzstan
Football clubs in Bishkek
2003 establishments in Kyrgyzstan
2004 disestablishments in Kyrgyzstan